CIAY-FM, branded as Life 100.7, is a Christian radio station in Whitehorse, Yukon, Canada. CIAY-FM broadcasts at 100.7 FM airing a combination of religious programming and Contemporary Christian music.

The station is licensed to the Bethany Pentecostal Tabernacle church and is operated by New Life FM, a nonprofit organization involving several other Christian groups. CIAY-FM went on the air in 2004, and relies mostly on volunteer labour.

Rebroadcasters
In addition to its transmitter in Whitehorse, CIAY-FM operates rebroadcasters in:
 Watson Lake, Yukon
 Teslin, Yukon
 Atlin, British Columbia
 Tuktoyuktuk, NWT
 Inuvik, NWT

References

External links
 
 

Iay
Iay
Radio stations established in 2004